was a professional wrestling event promoted by DDT Pro-Wrestling (DDT). The event took place on November 3, 2019, in Tokyo at the Ryōgoku Kokugikan. It was the first event under the Ultimate Party chronology. The event featured fourteen matches, nine of which were contested for championships. The event aired live on DDT's streaming service DDT Universe.

Storylines
The Ultimate Party 2019 event featured fourteen professional wrestling matches that involved different wrestlers from pre-existing scripted feuds and storylines. Wrestlers portrayed villains, heroes, or less distinguishable characters in the scripted events that built tension and culminated in a wrestling match or series of matches.

Event
There have been three pre-show matches. During the last one, two folding chairs fell on Shota, who was the 1,432nd Ironman Heavymetalweight Champion. Referee Yukinori Matsui counted this as a pinfall and awarded the title to the chair that was "pinning" Shota. He then counted a second pinfall as the second chair was lying on the first thus "pinning" it. As a result, the second chair was added to the participants of the Rumble rules match as the 1,434th defending champion. The main card had eleven matches, with the main event portraiting the winner-takes-all confrontation between the DDT Extreme Champion Harashima and the KO-D Openweight Champion Konosuke Takeshita. Harashima succeeded in defending his title and won the Openweight title for the tenth time in his career.

Results

Rumble rules match

Gauntlet tag team match

Notes

References

External links
The official DDT Pro-Wrestling website

DDT Ultimate Party
2019 in professional wrestling
November 2019 events in Japan
Professional wrestling in Tokyo
2019 in Tokyo
Events in Tokyo